The Edel Prime Bi is a South Korean two-place, paraglider that was designed and produced by Edel Paragliders of Gwangju. It is now out of production.

Design and development
The Prime Bi was designed as a tandem glider for flight training, hence Bi designation, indicating "bi-place" or two seater.

The glider is DHV 2 and AFNOR Bi-Place certified.

Specifications (Prime Bi)

References

Prime Bi
Paragliders